is a Japanese consumer electronics company headquartered in Daitō, Osaka. Apart from producing its own branded electronic products, it is also an OEM providing assembled televisions and video players/recorders to major corporations such as Sharp, Toshiba, Denon, and others. Funai supplies inkjet printer hardware technology to Dell and Lexmark, and produces printers under the Kodak name.

Its United States-based subsidiary Funai Corporation, Inc., based in Torrance, California, markets Funai products in the US, along with Funai-licensed brands including Philips, Magnavox, Emerson Radio, and Sanyo. Funai is the main supplier of electronics to Walmart and Sam's Club stores in the US, with production output in excess of 2 million flat-panel televisions during the summertime per year for Black Friday sale.

History
Funai was founded by Tetsuro Funai, the son of a sewing machine manufacturer. During the 1950s before the company was formed, Funai produced sewing machines and was one of the first Japanese makers to enter the United States retail market. Then, the introduction of transistor technology had begun to change the face of the electronics market. The Funai company was formed, Tetsuro Funai became CEO for 47 years and a US dollar billionaire, and the first actual products produced were the transistor radios.

In 1980, Funai launched a sales and manufacturing subsidiary in Germany. Funai also developed the Compact Video Cassette (CVC) format in the same year, a joint development with Technicolor, trying to compete with VHS and Betamax. Sales were poor and not well-received due to ongoing VHS vs. Beta war, and the CVC format was abandoned a few years later.

Funai introduced an arcade laserdisc video game, Interstellar, at Tokyo's Amusement Machine Show (AM Show) in September 1983. It demonstrated the use of pre-rendered 3D computer graphics. The game made its North American debut at the Amusement & Music Operators Association (AMOA) show in October 1983.

Funai began to see rising sales of the VHS format, so in 1984, Funai released its first VHS video cassette player (VP-1000) for the worldwide market, while ordering all transport chassis mechanisms from Shintom for quick and efficient production. VHS format quickly became more popular and won the war against Beta format, due to Funai's unique on-time delivery for supplying rental VHS players for the porn-film industry and viewers. By 1990, Funai became the largest 2-head mono VHS video cassette recorder (VCR) manufacturer in Japan.

In 1991, a U.S. sales subsidiary was established in New Jersey, and it began to sell cathode ray tube (CRT) televisions. In 1992, Funai canceled its contract from Shintom, due to the rising cost of VCR chassis mechanism and the expensive Japanese labor, and decided to build its own lower-cost chassis mechanism instead overseas. This creative move dramatically boosted up profits and reduced VCR prices down fast. Funai developed a new, permanent strategy in 1993 by opening two new state-of-the-art factories in China, which transferred all VHS VCRs production out from Japan. By 1997, Funai became the first manufacturer to sell a new VHS VCR below $100 for the North American market, while the Philips Magnavox brand they produced for was the best-seller. Quickly, Tetsuro Funai, the founder, became Japan's first US dollar billionaire electronic CEO. Later, the DVD technology was formed, and by 2001, Funai sold its first DVD player for less than $100.  By then, Funai's U.S. subsidiary had relocated to Torrance, California.  Today, Funai is one of the world's largest producers of DVD players, and is now one of the major suppliers of electronics to Wal-Mart on Black Friday.

In 2008, CEO and founder Tetsuro Funai retired and stepped down from CEO to become chairman. Philips signed a seven-year contract with Funai to license, sell, and distribute Philips- and Magnavox-branded televisions in North America. In 2013, Funai acquired the option to buy the rest of Philips' consumer electronics operations and a license to globally market Philips branded consumer electronics. But that purchase was terminated by Philips because of what Philips saw as breach of contract.

Lexmark
Funai has made inkjet hardware for  Lexmark International, Inc since 1997. In August 2012, Lexmark announced that it would be ceasing production of its inkjet printer line. In April 2013, Funai announced that it had signed an agreement to acquire Lexmark's inkjet-related technology and assets for approximately $100 million (approximately ¥ 9.5 billion).

Funai acquired more than 1,500 inkjet patents, Lexmark's inkjet-related research and development assets and tools, all outstanding shares and the manufacturing facility of Lexmark International (Philippines), Inc., and other inkjet-related technologies and assets. Through this transaction, Funai acquired the capabilities to develop, manufacture and sell inkjet hardware as well as inkjet supplies.

VHS videotape

The decline of VHS videotape began with the introduction to market of the DVD format in 1997. Funai continued to manufacture VHS tape recorders into the early part of the 21st century, mostly under the Emerson, Magnavox, and Sanyo brands in China and North America. In July 2016, Funai ceased production of VHS equipment, the last known company in the world to do so, after poor sales of its last VCR/DVD player combos.

See also
TP Vision acquired Philips branded TVs in some countries.

References

External links
  
  
 Funai Corporation USA

Companies based in Osaka Prefecture
Electronics companies established in 1961
Computer printer companies
Consumer electronics brands
Display technology companies
Electronics companies of Japan
Japanese brands
Companies listed on the Tokyo Stock Exchange
1961 establishments in Japan